Imre Fekete (born 11 October 1906, date of death unknown) was a Hungarian athlete. He competed in the men's long jump and the men's triple jump at the 1928 Summer Olympics.

References

1906 births
Year of death missing
Athletes (track and field) at the 1928 Summer Olympics
Hungarian male long jumpers
Hungarian male triple jumpers
Olympic athletes of Hungary
Place of birth missing
20th-century Hungarian people